U.S. Immigration Office, or variations with Station or Building, may refer to:

Angel Island, U.S. Immigration Station, near Tiburon, CA, listed on the NRHP in California
U.S. Immigration Office (Honolulu, Hawaii), listed on the NRHP in Hawaii
U.S. Immigration Building (Seattle, Washington), listed on the NRHP in King County, Washington
U.S. Post Office and Immigration Station-Nogales Main, in Nogales, AZ, listed on the NRHP in Arizona